The 1923 Calgary municipal election was held on December 12, 1923 to elect a mayor and six aldermen to sit on Calgary City Council. Additionally a commissioner, four members for the public school board and three members for the separate school board.

There were twelve aldermen on city council, but six of the positions were already filled: Frederick Johnston, Thomas H. Crawford, Frederick Ernest Osborne, Fred J. White, Neil I. McDermid, and John Walker Russell, were all elected to two-year terms in 1922 and were still in office.

The 1923 election was the first where a mayor would serve for two years after the bylaw providing for a two-year term was approved by the electorate.

A number of plebiscites were held, all requiring a two-thirds majority to pass.

The election was held under the Single Transferable Voting/Proportional Representation (STV/PR) with the term for candidates being two years.

The first woman elected to Calgary City Council, Annie Gale was defeated in the election. The Calgary Daily Herald reported approximately 4,240 women voted in the election, compared to 6,582 men.

Results

Mayor
Webster was elected on the first count.

Council
Quota for election was 1,574.

Public School Board

Separate School Board

Note: archived copies of The Calgary Daily Herald are poorly scanned and vote totals for candidates are not visible.

Plebiscite

Two Year Term for Mayor
Two Year Term for Mayor - Passed

River Protection Bylaw
Bylaw for protection of river. - Defeated

See also
List of Calgary municipal elections

References

1920s in Calgary
Municipal elections in Calgary
1923 elections in Canada